Cosmin Gherman (born 25 April 1984), is a Romanian futsal player who plays for City'us Târgu Mureş and the Romanian national futsal team.

References

External links
UEFA profile
Futsalplanet profile

1984 births
Living people
Romanian men's futsal players